Knuckleball! is a 2012 documentary film that follows the 2011 seasons of Tim Wakefield and R. A. Dickey, Major League Baseball's only knuckleball pitchers that year. It was released in theaters on September 20, 2012 and on DVD on April 2, 2013. Wakefield won his 200th game in 2011 and Dickey won the 2012 Cy Young Award.

Background
Stern and Sundberg's previous documentary was Joan Rivers: A Piece of Work. They had also previously directed the documentary The Devil Came on Horseback about the War in Darfur.

Plot
The film sets up the 2011 season by showing how the knuckleball saved both pitchers from obscurity. Dickey moved his family 37 times before landing with the New York Mets. The film presents Wakefield's chase of his 200th win as a member of the 2011 Red Sox and Dickey's make-it-or-break-it season with the 2011 Mets. It demonstrates the fraternal nature of knuckleball pitchers who trade tips of the trade via various meetings with the likes of Phil Niekro and Charlie Hough. Dickey won the Cy Young Award in November 2012.

Cast

Reception
 On Metacritic the film scored 73 out of 100 based on 9 reviews.

Neil Genzlinger of The New York Times, noted that the film's release coincided with Dickey's Cy Young run, which made the "first-rate sports documentary" especially sweet. The Boston Globe Ty Burr said "The movie's a must for baseball fans in general and Red Sox fans in particular". 
Even the film's harshest critics such as Time Out'''s David Fear says "Viewers who can’t get enough of ESPN's "30 for 30" docs will lap up this dual portrait", but continued to say that "Nonfans, however, are about to find out exactly what the phrase inside baseball'' means."

Notes

External links
  (archived from original)
 
 

2012 films
2012 documentary films
2010s sports films
American baseball films
Documentary films about baseball
Films set in 2011
Films set in Boston
Films set in New York City
Sports films based on actual events
Films directed by Ricki Stern and Anne Sundberg
2010s English-language films
2010s American films